Isaac Williams House is a historic home located near Newton Grove, Sampson County, North Carolina.  The farmhouse was built about 1867, and is a one-story, double-pile, five bay-by-four bay, transitional "Triple-A" frame dwelling, with Greek Revival style design elements.  It has a prominent front cross-gable roof and hip roofed, three bay, front porch. A -story rear ell was added about 1980.   Also on the property are the contributing servants quarters (c. 1867), family cemetery, and surrounding fields and woodlands.

It was added to the National Register of Historic Places in 1984, with a boundary increase in 1989.

References

Houses on the National Register of Historic Places in North Carolina
Greek Revival houses in North Carolina
Houses completed in 1867
Houses in Sampson County, North Carolina
National Register of Historic Places in Sampson County, North Carolina